Adam Watene (7 October 1977 – 13 October 2008), known as Adam Cook early in his career, also known by the nicknames of "Morlock", "Monster", and "The Gentle Giant", was a Cook Islands international rugby league footballer who played in the 2000s.

Background
Watene was born in New Zealand. He was of Maori, and Cook Islander descent.

He grew up with fellow rugby league footballer, Adam Wright.
Adam was the younger brother of rugby league footballer, Frank Watene.

Career
As Adam Cook he won caps for Cook Islands in the 2000 Rugby League World Cup.

Watene played for Wynnum Manly Seagulls and Burleigh Bears in the Queensland Cup in Australia before moving to the UK in 2005 to join the Castleford Tigers in National League One. In his last season with the Burleigh Bears he won the 2004 Queensland Cup. His move to Castleford was in doubt because of visa issues which led to him being chased by the Gateshead Thunder but eventually he joined Castleford.

In 2005 Watene helped the Castleford Tigers gain promotion to Super League and played alongside his brother Frank Watene. He was signed by Brian Noble in 2006 for the Bradford Bulls but only spent one year at the club before leaving for the Wakefield Trinity Wildcats (Heritage № 1237). In 2007 Watene had an outstanding season, despite missing part of the year due to injury and the death of his father.

Death
On 13 October 2008 Wakefield announced that he died of a suspected heart attack at the age of 31 after collapsing during a weight training session in the gym.

Jason Demetriou wore Watene's number 8 jersey in the season after Watene's death to honour his memory.

Personal life
Watene had a wife, Moana Watene, and two children.

At the time of his death he held the ceremonial position of the consort of Wakefield's deputy mayor, Heather Hudson.

Legacy
Two of Watene's former clubs in each hemisphere compete for specially commissioned trophies named in his honor.

Since 2009 Castleford Tigers and Wakefield Trinity have chosen one of their fixtures to contest the Adam Watene trophy.

And in the Southern Hemisphere Burleigh Bears and Wynnum Manly Seagulls play annually for the Adam Watene trophy.

References

External links
Statistics at rugbyleagueproject.org (as Adam Watene)
Statistics at rugbyleagueproject.org (as Adam Cook)
Profile at thecastlefordtigers.co.uk
Wakefield Trinity Wildcats profile
Super League profile

1977 births
2008 deaths
Bradford Bulls players
Burleigh Bears players
Castleford Tigers players
Cook Island expatriate rugby league players
Cook Island expatriates in the United Kingdom
Cook Island rugby league players
Cook Islands national rugby league team players
Expatriate rugby league players in England
New Zealand Māori rugby league players
Place of birth missing
Rugby league props
Wakefield Trinity players
Wynnum Manly Seagulls players
Sport deaths in England